The 2015 TCR International Series Buriram round was the tenth round of the 2015 TCR International Series season as well as the third round of the 2015 TCR Asia Series season. It took place on 25 October at the Chang International Circuit.

Pepe Oriola won the first race, starting from second position, and Stefano Comini gained the second one, both driving a SEAT León Cup Racer.

Success Ballast
Due to the results obtained in the previous round, Stefano Comini and Michael Choi received +30 kg, Kevin Gleason and Frank Yu +20 kg and Jordi Gené and George Chou +10 kg. Nevertheless, Yu and Chou didn't take part at this event, so they would have taken the ballast at the first round they would have participated.

Classification

Qualifying

Notes:
 – Filipe de Souza's times were cancelled because of an irregular external assistance to get back on track after an accident.
 – Douglas Khoo was moved to the back of the grid for having not set a time within the 107% limit.

Race 1

Race 2

Notes:
 – Tin Sritrai, Alain Menu, Robb Holland, Samson Chan and Douglas Khoo were moved to the back of the grid because of a parc fermé infringement.
 – Robb Holland was disqualified for not having served a drive through penalty.

Standings after the event

Drivers' Championship standings

Teams' Championship standings

 Note: Only the top five positions are included for both sets of drivers' standings.

References

External links
TCR International Series official website

Buriram
TCR International Series